The Courmayeur Ladies Open is a women's tennis tournament held in Courmayeur, Italy for female professional tennis players, whose first edition is part of the 2021 WTA Tour. It is held on indoor hardcourts (on Mapei surface) during late October. Currently it is a WTA 250 level event with prize money of $235,238.

Past finals

Singles

Doubles

References

Tennis tournaments in Italy
Women's tennis tournaments
Sport in Courmayeur